The Augusta Declaration, or the Memorial of Augusta County Committee, May 10, 1776, was a statement presented to the Fifth Virginia Convention in Williamsburg, Virginia on May 10, 1776. The Declaration announced the necessity of the Thirteen Colonies to form a permanent and independent union of states and national government separate from Great Britain, with whom the Colonies were at war.

When the Fifth Virginia Convention assembled on May 6, 1776, independence was a leading issue. Several of the delegates had already been instructed by their counties to pursue independence, and others had come with resolutions for independence in hand. The Augusta Declaration was the first official statement on the subject, being introduced by Thomas Lewis, on behalf of the Augusta County, Virginia Committee of Safety on May 10. Five days later, on May 15, the Convention declared Virginia wholly independent of Great Britain, and called for state papers (a declaration of rights and constitution), foreign alliances, and a confederation of the colonies. These resolutions were forwarded to the Second Continental Congress and introduced as the Lee Resolution, which initiated the drafting of the  United States Declaration of Independence, the Model Treaty (foreign policy), and the Articles of Confederation (the first U.S. constitution), respectively.

While legislation from various American counties and colonies had called for or emboldened independence from Great Britain, none had done so while proposing either a formal union of the colonies as states or a national government. The Augusta Declaration called for both, which the colonies would go on to adopt in the creation of the United States of America under the Articles and, ultimately, the United States Constitution. Virginia history scholar Hugh Blair Grigsby states the Augusta Declaration "deserves to be stereotyped as the Magna Charta of the West" for its precedent in calling for this governmental mode.

The document is presumed to be a lost work, with only an abstract surviving in the notations of the official journal of the Fifth Virginia Convention.

The Augusta Declaration
On May 10, 1776, Thomas Lewis introduced the Augusta Declaration to the Fifth Virginia Convention on behalf of the Augusta County, Virginia Committee of Safety. Specifics of the declaration are unknown, as it is currently lost. The abstract of the document was recorded in the journal of the Convention as such:

A representation from the committee of the county of Augusta was presented to the Convention, and read: setting forth the present unhappy situation of the country, and, from the ministerial measures of vengeance now pursuing, representing the necessity of making the confederacy of the United Colonies the most perfect, independent, and lasting; and of framing an equal, free, and liberal government, that may bear the test of all future ages.

This was the first official proposal for the creation of a permanent and independent union of states and national government from any of the Thirteen Colonies.

Fifth Virginia Convention

The Fifth Virginia Convention convened on May 6, 1776. There were three parties present. The first was mainly made up of wealthy planters, who sought to continue their hold on local government as it had grown up during colonial Virginia's history. These included Robert Carter Nicholas Sr. who opposed the Declaration of Independence from King George. This party, which saw little to gain and much to lose from a separation from Great Britain, dominated the convention by a malapportionment that lent an advantage to the slaveholding east. The second party was made up of the intellectuals of the Enlightenment: lawyers, physicians and "aspiring young men". These included the older generation of George Mason, George Wythe, and Edmund Pendleton, and the younger Thomas Jefferson and James Madison. The third, "radical party," was a minority of young men mainly from western Virginia, some of whom had supported independence earlier than 1775. The Augustans were from this party, with Thomas Lewis and Samuel McDowell serving as delegates.

When the convention began, three counties (Cumberland, Charlotte, and James City) had already drafted resolutions for independence. Delegates from several others had come to Williamsburg with prepared statements on the issue, while most others had come knowing the question would be addressed. Over the first several sessions, the Convention dealt with matters largely related to the ongoing war effort. On May 10, the fifth session of the Convention, Thomas Lewis introduced the Augusta Declaration on behalf of the Augusta County Committee of Safety. This was the first statement on the issue of independence during this Convention, and would influence final resolution on the subject. On May 14, the Convention resolved itself into a committee to debate the question of independence in full.
The following day, May 15, the committee came to a unanimously agreement "to propose to Congress to declare the United Colonies free and independent States, absolved from all allegiance to, or dependence upon, the Crown or Parliament of Great Britain".

The Convention adopted resolutions calling for: 
 state papers (a declaration of rights and constitution) 
 foreign alliances
 a confederation of the colonies

With this, Virginia became the first colony to instruct its delegates in Congress to introduce both a resolution for independence and a federal union of the colonies. The last resolution, specifically, was responsive to the Augusta Declaration.

On to Congress
These resolutions were forwarded to Richard Henry Lee, the Virginia representative to the Continental Congress, who introduced them to that body on June 7, almost verbatim:

Resolved, That these United Colonies are, and of right ought to be, free and independent States, that they are absolved from all allegiance to the British Crown, and that all political connection between them and the State of Great Britain is, and ought to be, totally dissolved.

That it is expedient forthwith to take the most effectual measures for forming foreign Alliances.

That a plan of confederation be prepared and transmitted to the respective Colonies for their consideration and approbation.

The Congress organized into groups to draft statements for each resolution. These efforts resulted in the creation of the United States Declaration of Independence, July 4, 1776; the Model Treaty (foreign policy), September 17, 1776; and the Articles of Confederation (first U.S. constitution), March 1, 1781.

Augusta County Committee of Safety

Background
After Parliament closed the ports of Boston and passed the Intolerable Acts to punish Massachusetts for the Boston Tea Party, the Virginia House of Burgesses organized a protest as a show of solidarity with Boston. In response, Virginia royal governor Lord Dunmore dissolved the House of Burgesses. The burgesses then formed the extralegal Virginia Conventions in place of the dissolved House, scheduling the first session for August 1. Augusta County's elected delegates for this session, Samuel McDowell and George Mathews, did not attend the first of these Conventions, likely due to the recent end of Dunmore's War in which the Augusta County militia was heavily involved. For the remaining conventions, Augusta County sent Thomas Lewis and Samuel McDowell as their delegates.

In October, 1774, the First Continental Congress directed that a committee of safety be appointed in "every county, city, and town" for the primary reason of monitoring imports and exports to ensure compliance with a boycott of British goods. Over the next year the roles of the county committees expanded to include the raising of militia units, providing local government, and implementing and upholding new policy from the Continental Congress.

The Augusta Resolves

The first recorded action of the Augusta County Committee of Safety was a patriotic meeting taking place on February 22, 1775 in Staunton, Virginia, which resulted in the drafting of the Augusta Resolves. These resolves stated the intent of the Augustans to support the Continental Congress, to pledge 'life and fortune' in preservation of their natural liberties, and to ally with "all British America" in securing these liberties. The Augusta Resolves, along with the resolutions of nearby Fincastle, Botetourt, and Pittsylvania counties, were the most significant of the second of two broad waves of resolutions passed by nearly every Virginia county from summer 1774 through winter 1775, and were unique in demonstrating a national scope that previous resolutions had not. The Augusta County committee's revolutionary activity continued throughout the next year, organizing militia and functioning as an extralegal local government. The Virginia committees of safety were replaced with standard courts when Virginia created its own permanent government.

Members
While the committee's declaration of May 10, 1776 is presumed lost, at least one memorial (petition) from the committee survives with its signatories intact. This memorial, dated November 9, 1776, and which relates to religion and taxation, is signed by the following:

 Thomas Lewis
 Sampson Mathews 
 Samuel McDowell 
 N. Thompson
 Michael Bowyer 
 Alexander Sinclair
 William Bowyer
 Ja's Tate
 William McPheeters
 John Gilmore
 William Stephenson
 William Lewis
 John Cyle Jr.
 James Steel 
 Abraham Smith

Contemporary references
Several contemporary references to the Augusta Declaration exist outside of the journal of the Fifth Virginia Convention. Among them:
Gabriel Jones, Clerk of Hampshire County, referenced the declaration in an irascible letter to George Washington, on June 6, 1777, in which he expresses contempt for the people of Augusta: "These wretches, I mean inhabitants, of Augusta have forgot when they petitioned the Assembly for abolishing the established church and to declare independancy  how they promised their lives and fortunes should be spent in supporting the Cause if their humble prayer should be granted . . ."
James Madison, in a 1827 manuscript, copied the abstract of the Augusta Declaration verbatim as found in the journal of the Fifth Virginia Convention, with queries as to the date and location of the document. An editor for U.S. National Archives notes, "Clearly pertinent to [Madison's] subject, [the Augusta Declaration] must have attracted his special interest . . ."

Legacy

Historian Pauline Maier identifies more than ninety 'declarations of independence' that were issued throughout the Thirteen Colonies from April to July 1776. Among these were the Halifax Resolves, which on April 12 authorized the North Carolina delegates to the Continental Congress to vote in favor of independence should such a vote reach the floor; and the Rhode Island Act of Renunciation, which on May 4 officially renounced that colony's allegiance to George III. In Virginia, several counties adopted resolutions in favor of independence by the end of April: Cumberland County On April 22; Charlotte County on April 23; James City on April 24.

A confederation of the colonies had also been proposed by this time. Benjamin Franklin had introduced a plan for confederation of the thirteen colonies during the July, 1775 session of the Continental Congress. This plan, which was not adopted, left open the possibility for reconciliation with Britain (aspects of his plan would be revived for the Articles of Confederation). In Virginia, Patrick Henry had  been a supporter of confederation. A resolution he authored for the Fifth Virginia Convention and debated May 15 called for the independence of all thirteen colonies, which he intended to be a step toward confederation. Letters he would write to both John Adams and Richard Henry Lee on May 20 suggested the importance he placed on the issue.

Hugh Blair Grigsby, Virginia historical scholar, states that while several bodies had declared or cleared the way for a vote for independence, and while Congress had, also on May 10, instructed the colonies to form temporary governments to address the domestic needs of their people, no one in the colonies had yet laid out, as did the Committee of Safety from Augusta County, Virginia, a proposal for the creation of a permanent and independent union of states and national government for the Colonies. Grigsby states that this declaration is analogous to England's Magna Carta, which concerned the medieval relationship between English monarch and barons, but has come to be seen as an iconic statement of the rights of ordinary people.

A writer for an 1887 issue of The Nation states: "The distinction [to which Grigsby refers] is too technical to be of great value; at best, Augusta County was a year behind Mecklenburg, and far less outspoken than Buckingham, whose delegates to the Virginia Convention were bluntly instructed "to cause a total and final separation from Great Britain to take place as soon as possible."" Grigsby indeed notes that the Buckingham County statement, published June 14, 1776, but probably written May 13, is "the only paper which can stand near [the Augusta Declaration]." Others have noted that the Mecklenburg Resolves, while radical, left open the possibility of reconciliation with Great Britain and were not a declaration that the people of Mecklenburg County were free and independent of The Crown.

References

Bibliography
 
 
 
 Jensen, Merrill. The Founding of a Nation: A History of the American Revolution, 1763–1776. New York: Oxford University Press, 1968.

Further reading

1775 in the Thirteen Colonies
Virginia in the American Revolution
Documents of the American Revolution
1775 in Virginia
1775 documents
Augusta County, Virginia